Strayhorn may refer to:

Billy Strayhorn (1915-1967), American composer
Carole Keeton Strayhorn (born 1939), American politician
Strayhorn, Mississippi, an unincorporated community

See also
Fred Strahorn